The Australian Producers' Home Journal is an English-language newspaper which was published in 1910 in Sydney,  New South Wales, Australia.  It was published by S. A. Sawell.

History 
The Australian Producers' Home Journal was a monthly publication, usually published on the third Tuesday of each month. The paper featured articles on agricultural industries including dairy farming, fruit growing, the sheep industry as well as providing general advice about the management of farmyards and farms generally.
  
According to the issue of the newspaper dated 23 August 1910, "This paper is sent free to subscribers to 'The Stock and Station Journal'".

Digitisation 
Some editions of the paper have been digitised as part of the Australian Newspapers Digitisation Program project hosted by the National Library of Australia.

See also
List of newspapers in Australia
List of newspapers in New South Wales

References

External links 
 

Defunct newspapers published in Sydney